ISO/IEC 10116 Information technology — Security techniques — Modes of operation for an n-bit block cipher is an international standard that specifies modes of operation for block ciphers of any length.

The modes defined are:
 Electronic codebook (ECB)
 Cipher block chaining (CBC)
 Cipher feedback (CFB)
 Output feedback (OFB)
 Counter (CTR)

The standard notes that some modes require padding, but states that "Padding techniques ... are not within the scope of this International Standard."

References 

10116